Henry IX Reuss, Count of Köstritz (15 September 1711 in Köstritz – 16 September 1780 in Berlin) Count Reuss had to Köstritz. Henry IX was the founder of the middle branch Köstritz Reuss.

Life 
Henry IX was a son of Count Henry XXIV and his wife, Baroness Eleonore of Promnitz-Dittersbach (1688-1776).

Henry earned a degree in Law and Political Sciences.  After his grand tour, he went to the estates of his mother in Silesia, where he took up a legal office.  Through his family connections he met with the future King Frederick II of Prussia.  He then took up a position as councillor at the Kammergericht in Berlin.

From 1762 to 1769, he was Henry Royal Prussian Postmaster General and Chief of the postal system.  He later rose to become directing minister, top civil servant and close personal advisor to Frederick the Great.

He died in 1780 and was buried in the Garrison Church in Berlin.

Marriage and issue 
Henry IX married on 7 June 1743 in Dorth, near Deventer, to Amalie (1715-1787), a daughter of Count Charles of Wartensleben and Flodroff and his wife Johanna Margarita Huysseman von Cattendyck.  With her he had the following nine children:
 Emily (1745-1754)
 Sophie (1746-1746)
 Henry XXXVII (1747-1774)
 Henry XXXVIII (1748-1835), Count Reuss of Köstritz
 Henry XXXIX (1750-1815)
 Henry XLI (1751-1753)
 Henry XLIV (1753-1832), Prince Reuss of Köstritz
 Louise (1756-1807), married in 1792 to Baron Charles of Knobelsdorff
 Henry L (1760-1764)

References 
Thomas Gehrlein: Das Haus Reuss. Älterer und Jüngerer Linie, Börde Verlag, 2006, 
Friedrich Wilhelm Trebge: Spuren im Land, Hohenleuben, 2005

Counts of Reuss
House of Reuss
1711 births
1780 deaths